The 1929 Washington & Jefferson Presidents football team was an American football team that represented Washington & Jefferson College as an independent during the 1929 college football season. The team compiled a 5–2–2 record and outscored opponents by a total of 142 to 33. Bill Amos was the head coach.

Schedule

References

Washington and Jefferson
Washington & Jefferson Presidents football seasons
Washington and Jefferson Presidents football